Aegis Malinnov Sdn Bhd also known as Malinnov (short for Malaysia Innovation) is a defence and security company that focusses on designing and manufacturing firearms, ammunitions and the distribution of defence and security related products mainly for Malaysian government agencies.

History

The company was formed in 2012. It started with gaining the rights to distribute firearms in Malaysia.

Malinnov moved to indigenous production of firearms when it unveiled the Malinnov M1P in 2015. The company said that they planned to publicly debut it in the LIMA 2017 convention.

However, it was reported in 2019 that the M1P was not further marketed by the company since it was dropped from its website.

Products
Malinnov M1P
Malinnov 1911

References

External Links
 Official Site

2012 establishments in Malaysia
Privately held companies of Malaysia
Malaysian brands
Firearm manufacturers of Malaysia
Defense companies of Malaysia
Manufacturing companies based in Kuala Lumpur